Acanthophyllum elatius is a species of plant in the family Caryophyllaceae. The species is perennial. It is native to central Asia.

References 

Caryophyllaceae
Taxa named by Alexander von Bunge